Paul-Jacques Bonzon (31 August 1908 – 24 September 1978) was a French writer, best known for the series Les six compagnons ("Six companions"). He was born in Sainte-Marie-du-Mont, Manche and educated in Saint-Lô. In 1935 he married a teacher in Drôme and moved to this department, where he worked as a school teacher and later principal for twenty-five years. He died in Valence in 1978.

Publications 

 Mamadi ou le petit roi d'ébène
 Le petit passeur du lac
 Du gui pour Christmas
 The orphans of Simitra / Les orphelins de Simitra. Adapted by Nippon Animation into the anime series Porphy no Nagai Tabi.
 Le cheval de verre
 Soleil de mon Espagne
 La promesse de Primerose
 Un secret dans la nuit polaire
 The gold cross of Santa Anna / La croix d'or de Santa-Anna
 
 La disparue de Montélimar
 Mon Vercors en feu
 Le voyageur sans visage
 La ballerine de Majorque
 L'Éventail de Séville

References

20th-century French non-fiction writers
20th-century French male writers
French children's writers
1908 births
People from Manche
1978 deaths